Keregodu  is a village in the southern state of Karnataka, India. It is located in the Mandya taluk of Mandya district in Karnataka. Panchalingeshwara temple is a noted landmark here.

Demographics
 India census, Keregodu had a population of 9619 with 4705 males and 4914 females.

Noted people
 A. P. Arjun - film director

See also
 Mandya
 Districts of Karnataka

References

External links
 http://Mandya.nic.in/

Villages in Mandya district